This page presents the current and previous members of the Council of Paris, who are elected for a six-year term.

2014–2020 councillors

This list presents the 163 councillors of Council of Paris elected in the 2014 Paris municipal election.

Summary table by arrondissement

List

2008–2014 councillors
PCF = French Communist Party
PG = Left Party
NC = New Centre (New Centre and Independents)
PS = Socialist Party
UMP = Union for a Popular Movement
EELVA = Europe Ecology – The Greens

Notes

See also 
 Council of Paris
 2014 Paris municipal election

References 

 
2014 elections in France
Municipal elections in France
2014 in Paris
Councillors
Paris councillors